Edith Kurzweil (born 1924 Vienna - died February 6, 2016 New York City) was an American writer, and editor of Partisan Review. In 1995, she married William Phillips. She graduated with a Ph.D. in sociology. She taught at Rutgers University.

Awards
 2003 National Humanities Medal
 1982 Rockefeller Humanities Fellowship
 1987 National Endowment for the Humanities Fellowship

Works

Editor

References

American editors
Jewish emigrants from Austria to the United States after the Anschluss
1924 births
2016 deaths
Rutgers University faculty
National Humanities Medal recipients